The 2011–12 Welsh Premier League season was the 20th season of the Welsh Premier League, the highest football league of Wales since its establishment in 1992. Bangor City were the defending champions, but lost their title to The New Saints in a meeting on the final game of the season.

Teams
Haverfordwest County were relegated to the 2011–12 Football League Division One at the end of the 2010–11 season after finishing at the bottom of the table. The club thus ended a fourteen-year tenure in the league. They were replaced by 2010–11 Football League runners-up Afan Lido, who returned to the Premier League after six seasons.

Originally, Bala Town as 11th-placed team were going to be relegated as well; however, they were eventually spared as 2010–11 Cymru Alliance champions Connah's Quay Nomads were denied a Premier League licence.

Stadia and location

League table

Results
Teams played each other twice on a home and away basis, before the league was split into two groups at the end of round 22 – the top six and the bottom six.
Clubs in these groups played each other twice again bringing the total fixture count to 32.

Matches 1–22

Matches 23–32

Top six

Bottom six

UEFA Europa League play-offs
Teams who finished in positions fourth through eighth at the end of the season participated in a play-off to determine the second participant for the 2012–13 UEFA Europa League. As Neath failed to win their appeal against an FAW Domestic licence, Aberystwyth Town took their place (See Relegation Section)

Quarter-finals

Semi-finals

Final

Top goalscorers

References

External links
 Welsh Premier League Football

Cymru Premier seasons
1
Wales